Chris O'Ryan (born July 6, 1980), known professionally as Tek, is a Grammy Award-winning Australian music producer and sound engineer. He is best known for sound engineering and doing vocal production for multiple major music artists, including Justin Bieber, Katy Perry, Mary J. Blige, Ciara  and Mariah Carey.

Early life and education 
O'Ryan began studying music at the age of eight when he took up piano and choir. In 1992, at the age of 12, he sang in Opera Australia's production of Hansel and Gretel. He then studied music for two years at Box Hill College of Music in Melbourne, Australia.

Career 
O'Ryan relocated to Los Angeles after completing his studies to pursue music in the United States. He began working as an unpaid intern for a small label and worked his way up to the position of lead engineer. While at this company, he connected with multiple producers and songwriters from Atlanta, including Tricky Stewart, The Dream & Poo Bear, whom he would later collaborate with.

In 2006, O'Ryan reunited with Tricky Stewart and over the next few years, he engineered records for Usher, Mariah Carey, Celine Dion, Rihanna, and Mary J. Blige, for which he won a Grammy Award. During this time, he began using Melodyne for vocal tuning. He has tuned over 1,000 releases and network television shows.

In 2011, O'Ryan incorporated his entertainment company Tekzenmusic Inc., and in 2013, started building his studio TZM Studios. In early 2014, TZM Studios was operational with its first major clients being Justin Bieber and Mariah Carey.

In 2017, O'Ryan signed the Australian music producer Black Summer and released his debut single "Young Like Me (feat. Lowell)" under the label Tekzenmusic. The music video, directed by Tim Maxx, was filmed in Los Angeles and released on national television in Australia on Nine Network.

Discography

References

External links 
 Tek Official Website
 The Recording Academy - Chris "Tek" O'Ryan

1980 births
Living people
Grammy Award winners
Australian expatriates in the United States
Australian record producers